The Belgian National Badminton League, also known as Victor League (sponsored by Victor), is the top interclub competition in Belgian badminton. There are 2 national divisions organized by the Belgian Badminton Federation. All other divisions are organized per region. The competition format was restyled during the season 2007–2008.

The competition
Both national divisions consist of 8 participating clubs. These participate in 7 qualification weekends. After these qualifications, the top 4 teams will play the play-offs for the title. The bottom 4 teams will compete each other in the play-downs to maintain their position in the league.

During each match, 8 confrontations are played: 1 Men's doubles, 1 Women's doubles, 2 Men's Singles, 2 Women's Singles and 2 Mixed Doubles.

The 2010-2011 clubs
For this season, the 8 participating clubs are the following:

Past Champions

References

External links
The Belgian Badminton Federation official website
BB 2de NATIONALE 08-09
BBF 1ste NATIONALE 0910
Ligue Francophone Belge de Badminton official website

Badminton in Belgium